Santa Maria dei Miracoli is a church in the sestiere of Cannaregio, in Venice, Italy.

Architecture and restoration
Also known as the "marble church", it is one of the best examples of the early Venetian Renaissance including colored marble, a false colonnade on the exterior walls (pilasters), and a semicircular pediment. The organisation Save Venice Inc. restored the church over a period of seven years, from 1990 to 1997 (after several years of preliminary research). The treatments focussed on the marble sheeting and sculptural decoration of both the exterior and interior of the church. The marble cladding contained 14% salt, and was on the point of bursting, when restorers began the desalination and cleaning process. All marble cladding was removed, and cleaned in stainless steel tanks, in a solution of distilled water. Additionally, the campaign worked in the coffered ceiling, which was made up of fifty-two wooden panels depicting saints and prophets. The cleaning led to the rediscovery of frescoes of sibyls on the spandrels of the ceiling. Nearly every part of the church was examined and treated, including the intarsia doors in the presbytery, the bronze statues and candelabra of the high altar, and the wooden panel of the Madonna from which the church got its name. The restoration was calculated to cost 1 million dollars, the final cost was 4 million dollars. The main altar is reached by a series of steps. The circular facade windows recall Donato Bramante's churches in Milan.

History
Built between 1481 and 1489 by Pietro Lombardo to house a miraculous icon of the Virgin Mary. The plans for the church were expanded in 1484 to include the construction of a new convent for nuns of St. Clare to the east. The convent was connected to the gallery of the church by an enclosed walkway that was later destroyed.

The interior is enclosed by a wide barrel vault, with a single nave. The nave is dominated by an ornamental marble stair rising between two pulpits, with statues by Tullio Lombardo, Alessandro Vittoria and Niccolò di Pietro. The vaulted ceiling is divided into fifty coffers decorated with paintings of prophets, a work by Girolamo Pennacchi's contemporaries, Vincenzo dalle Destre and Lattanzio da Rimini.

See also
 History of medieval Arabic and Western European domes
 History of Italian Renaissance domes
 History of early modern period domes

External links

Churches in Cannaregio
Santa Maria dei Miracoli

References

Roman Catholic churches completed in 1489
Maria dei Miracoli, Venice
Maria dei Miracoli, Venice
Renaissance architecture in Venice